William Joseph Condon (April 7, 1895 – August 17, 1967) was an American prelate of the Roman Catholic Church. He served as bishop of the Diocese of Great Falls in Montana from 1939 until his death in 1967.

Biography

Early life 
William Condon was born on October 14, 1977, in Colton, Washington, to Patrick and Mary Elizabeth (née Kavanaugh) Condon. He graduated from St. Patrick's Seminary in Menlo Park, California, in 1917.

Priesthood 
Condon was ordained to the priesthood for the Diocese of Spokane on October 14, 1917. He then served as a curate at the Cathedral of Our Lady of Lourdes Parish in Spokane, Washington. In 1918, Condon entered Gonzaga University in Spokane.

Condon earned a Bachelor of Arts degree from Gonzaga in 1919, and then served as pastor of St. Joseph's Parish in Waterville, Washington, for four years. From 1923 to 1929, he was rector of Our Lady of Lourdes Cathedral. While serving as pastor of St. Augustine's Parish in Spokane between 1929 and 1939, he was also secretary to Bishop Charles White (1928-1932), and chancellor (1927-1939) and vicar general (1933-1939) of the diocese.

Bishop of Great Falls 
On August 5, 1939, Condon was appointed the third bishop of the Diocese of Great Falls by Pope Pius XII. He received his episcopal consecration on October 18, 1939, from Bishop Charles White, with Bishops Joseph Francis McGrath and Edward Kelly serving as co-consecrators. He was installed in St. Ann's Cathedral on October 26, 1939. Condon led the diocese for twenty-seven years, the longest-serving bishop of the diocese. Between 1962 and 1965, he attended the Second Vatican Council in Rome.

William Condon died on August 16, 1977, at age 72, and is buried at Mount Olivet Cemetery in Great Falls.

References

1895 births
1967 deaths
People from Colton, Washington
Roman Catholic Diocese of Spokane
Roman Catholic bishops of Great Falls
20th-century Roman Catholic bishops in the United States
Participants in the Second Vatican Council
Saint Patrick's Seminary and University alumni
Gonzaga University alumni
Religious leaders from Washington (state)
Catholics from Washington (state)